Anuradha Pal is a Tabla virtuoso, multi-percussionist and music composer who is acclaimed as the first professional female tabla player in the world by Encyclopedia Britannica and the Limca Book of Records.

Her story is one of courage, fortitude, commitment and creativity. She ‘stormed the male bastion of Indian Rhythm’ (Sunday Observer 1996) as a child prodigy when barely nine years old. Countering unfair chauvinism, discrimination and politics with rigorous study, focused riyaaz, hard work and grit, first-generation Musician Anuradha Pal established herself as a ‘colossus on the percussion firmament and a trendsetter’ (Tribune 2009).

Catalyzed by her own struggles, she founded the first ever all-female Indian Classical music band, Stree Shakti in 1996 to provide a platform to other deserving women, enthralling audiences in prestigious festivals worldwide for over 25 years.

She is empanelled as an Outstanding category musician with Ministry of Culture & Indian Council for Cultural Relations, Top graded Vidushi of All India Radio and is revered globally for her superb tonal quality, complimenting musicality and pinpoint rhythmic artistry, founded on over 25 years of rigorous training. Anuradha is also appreciated for her fresh perspective and knowledge of 6 gharanas of Tabla, her sensitive and thoughtful accompaniment with leading masters of Hindustani and Carnatic music and International collaborations with World music, dance, poetry, painting etc.

Brand ambassador of Beti Bachao Beti Padhao, Anuradha has been hailed as 'Bharat ki Laxmi',  ‘Rhythm Queen’, 'Percussionist par excellence', ‘Tabla phenomenon’ (India Today 2000), a ‘Trailblazer, trendsetter and Torchbearer', ‘the most influential woman in Indian Music (A.V. Max Magazine 2001), ‘National pride and inspiration’ (Tribune 2012), prominent Torchbearer of Indian Classical Music, and a ‘Woman of Pure Wonder’for empowering other girls and changing society's perception. (Sahara Times 2004).

Lauded as a female empowerment icon, Anuradha has several trendsetting firsts - musical and social contributions - to her credit.

Early life
Anuradha Pal was born in Mumbai to pharmaceutical doyen, Devinder Pal and painter-writer Ila Pal. She initiated her tabla training under Shri Manikrao Popatkar and Pt. Madan Mishra, both of the Benares Gharana and finally became a Ganda Bandhan shagird of Ustad Alla Rakha and Ustad Zakir Hussain of the Punjab Gharana.

A child prodigy, she gave her first performance for Doordarshan at the age of 9 years. With her work incredible Tayyari, Layakari and immaculate presentation she was described as the Lady Zakir Hussain by Maharashtra Times, when she was just seventeen.

Career

Professional Accomplishments

She is acknowledged as ‘first professional female Tabla player in the World’  in Limca Book of Records 1991.

In January 2018 she was awarded with the prestigious Ministry of WCD First Ladies Award  by the President of India for being the first and youngest female Indian musician to perform at the world famous WOMAD and Woodstock Festivals. for 150,000 and 400,000 fans respectively.

She composed the background score for M. F. Husain's film Gaja Gamini, using only her Tabla and voice, which was appreciated as ‘innovative and evocative’ at the Cannes Film festival, 1999. She has also composed music for NGMA, short films, documentaries, theatre and other commissioned work and events.

She first performed with her Gurus when she was just 15 years old and has been accompanying master Hindustani and Carnatic Classical vocalists, instrumentalists and dancers, as well as young maestros since she was 13. In 2018, she led a possible World record 217 Tabla players  on one stage, to pay tribute to her Guru, Ustad Alla Rakha in celebration of his birth centenary.

She created the first Instructional Tabla training Video DVD modules in 2003, which became extremely popular, making her a trendsetter in online music education.

She has performed for dignitaries like Bharat Ratna Atal Bihari Vajpayee, President Dr. A.P.J. Abdul Kalam, Vice President Venkaiah Naidu, Sushma Swaraj, Smriti Irani, Maneka Gandhi & Col. Rajyavardhan Singh Rathore as well as the Queens of England and Thailand.

She has conducted Lecture Demonstrations and workshops at Harvard University, Berklee College of Music, M.I.T (USA), Vienna Boys Choir, Palazzo Ducale (Italy), MilapFest (U.K), Monash University (Australia) and was invited as an artist-in-residence by the New England Conservatory of Music in 2006.

She contributed in the research for the books 'Relationship between Music, Language & the Brain' at Neurosciences University, San Diego and 'Study of Tabla, Aesthetics & Complexities' at the Harvard Science Centre.

As an inspirational orator, she has given TED Talks in Goa, Mumbai, Baroda and delivered inspirational presentations at IIT Mumbai, BITS Pilani, NMIMS, ITA, CCRT, Rotary Club and Lions Club in India.

She represented India at the Asian Performer's Summit in Japan in 1999.

She has been lauded by Encyclopaedia Britannica for ‘her well balanced musicianship and pioneering contribution as a trailblazer and trendsetter around the world’.

Performances at Major music festivals
USA - Masters of Indian Music Festival, Young Music Wizards of India, Asia Society, Ali Akbar Khan Festival, Basant Bahar Festival, MITHAS, Learnquest Music Festival.

UK - WOMAD (Reading), Bath International Music festival, MilapFest, Commonwealth Games Festival, City of London Festival, Asian Music Festival, Rhythm Sticks Festival, Greenwich & Docklands Festival, Darbar Festival, Cardiff Jazz Festival, BBC Music Live Festival (Scotland).

EUROPE - Woodstock Festival (Poland), Voices of the World Festival (Denmark), Sangam Indian Music Festival (Germany), Museum Rietberg (Switzerland), Festival Musicale del Mediterraneo (Italy), Theatre de la Ville (France), Night of the Virtuosos Festival (Reunion Islands), Amrita Sher-Gil Cultural Centre, University of Esztergom (Hungary), The Music Academy, Zadar Puppet Theatre, Croatian National Theatre (Croatia), Madlenianum Opera and Theatre (Serbia).

ASIA - Global Fusion Festival (Dubai), Vrindavan Festival (Hong Kong), Bangkok International Music Festival (Thailand), Victoria Arts Hall (Singapore), Tokyo Music festival, Phoenix Music Festival (Japan).

AFRICA - Night of the Virtuosos Festival (Mauritius), CHOGM Summit (Nigeria).

AUSTRALIA/ NEW ZEALAND - Bellingen Global Carnival, Carnevale Festival, Queensland Performing Arts Complex, The Octagon.

INDIA -  IIT 'Mood Indigo’, IIT Roots, Elephanta & Banganga Festivals, P.L. Deshpande Festival, Kala Ghoda Festival, Gunidas Sammelan, Mumbai Sanskruti Festival (Mumbai), Ajanta Ellora Festival, Vasantrao Deshpande Festival, Kalidas Samaroh, Ganesh Utsav, Swara Malhar Festival, Sanskruti Arts Festival, Tabla Samaroh, AIR Silver Jubilee Celebrations, Bal Gandharva Utsav, Sangeet Shankar Darbar (Maharashtra).

Sriram Shankarlal Festival, INTACH, Parampara Festival, Spirit of Unity Concerts, Vishnu Digambar Jayanti Samaroh, Dilli Durbar, Ustad Chand Khan Samaroh, DD National (Tejaswini 100th Episode), Bhatkhande Sangit Vidyalaya, Bhairav Se Sohni Sammelan, Guru Bholanath Festival (New Delhi).

Sankat Mochan Mahotsav, Kanthe Maharaj Samaroh, Ganga Mahotsav, Budhwa Mangal Samaroh, Kala Academy, Subah-e-Benaras, Akashwani Sangeet Sammelan, Vrindavan Sangeet Samaroh (Uttar Pradesh).

Saptak Festival, Naada Festival, Baroda, Surat, Rajkot, Valsad (Gujarat).

Dover Lane Music Conference, Salt Lake Music Festival, Uttarpara Sangeet Chakra, Sangeet Piyasi, Tagore Centre, ITC SRA (West Bengal).

Rashtriya Sanskriti Mahotsav, Bhopal Utsav, Hriday Drishyam, Bharat Bhavan, Kumar Gandharva Samaroh, Raag Amir, Ameer Khan Samaroh, Alauddin Khan Samaroh, Kalidas Samaroh, Simhasth Kumbh, Utsav Mahakaleshwar, Tansen Samaroh, Malwa Utsav (Madhya Pradesh).

Malleshwaram Sabha, Gururao Deshpande, Chowdiah Hall, Handshake Concert, Bridging Cultures, Shimoga Ramnavami Festival, Hampi Utsav, Rani Chennamma Festival, Karkala Festival, REC Surathkal, Megh Sandhya, Sthree Swarangini Mangalore (Karnataka).

North Eastern States : Handshake Concert Kohima, Sangeet Nritya Mahotsav Imphal, SPICMACAY(Assam, Meghalaya, Nagaland & Manipur), Sanskriti School Guwahati. 

ICCR Horizon Series, Jawahar Kala Kendra Jaipur, BITS Pilani, SNA Festival (Jodhpur, Kota), Maharana Kumbha Samaroh, Shilpgram, Maharana Mewar Foundation (Rajasthan); besides various other performances across 23 Indian states.

OTHER - Festival of India (Brazil), Festival Musique Multi Montreal (Canada)

Musical Offerings & Innovations
By specially composing Rhythm based creations like Krishna Ke Taal, Ramayan, Ardhanarishwari and interactive Tabla Jugalbandis, Anuradha has redefined expression through percussion, in her dedicated efforts to increase appreciation and understanding of Tabla and percussion for over 20 years. Some of her musical innovations include - 
Anuradha Pal in Tabla Jugalbandi with herself (2005)  - An innovative, rhythmic dialogue between the traditional and contemporary. She presents easy to understand, original stories on two Tablas - husband-wife arguing, mother-daughter interaction, stories from the Ramayan & Mahabharat epics, Ardhanarishwar i.e. purush & prakruti in Indian spirituality  & contemporary interpretations of the magic of monsoons, steam engine, horse galloping, Mumbai traffic & festivals like Holi, Diwali, Ram Navami etc.

Anuradha Pal's Stree Shakti (1996)  - The first all-female Indian Classical Music band formed by Anuradha Pal on International Women's Day 1996, championing the cause of Women in Music and reflecting the emergence of woman power in the traditionally male dominated field of Indian rhythm. The band features a unique combination of Hindustani with Carnatic music, melody with rhythm and the traditional with contemporary. They have enthralled audiences at some of the biggest music festivals in the world and also toured with the Pan-African Orchestra from Ghana for a concert tour of UK and Ireland in 2002.
Anuradha Pal's Su-Fo-Re (2015)  - A first of its kind Folk roots band combining Sufi music, Qawwali, uplifting Rajasthani Folk, Hindustani and Carnatic Classical music with World percussion.
Anuradha Pal's Recharge (2007)  - An extremely unique & electrifying fusion of Indian Classical, Jazz, Folk & Sufi Music, combined with passionate & groovy rhythms from Africa, Latin America & India; connecting people & cultures from around the globe, celebrating unity amidst diversity.

Social Work

Contribution to Female Empowerment
Anuradha has been promoting other female musicians struggling in male dominated fields, thus through her band Stree Shakti, for over 25 years.

She has performed at Sri Agrasen Kanya PG College (Varanasi), Rebel Girls Interactive (Delhi), Ruia College (Mumbai) to inspire young girls towards self-empowerment and building self-esteem.

She wrote the lyrics ‘Khud ko tu Pehchaan de’ and composed the anthem for Ministry of Women and Child Development's Nari Shakti campaign in March 2018.

For her contributions, she was appointed the Brand Ambassador of Prime Minister Shri Narendra Modi's Beti Bachao Beti Padhao yojana in 2017.

She was also the UNICEF Brand Ambassador for female empowerment, education and inclusion in 2006.

On 11th Oct 2020, International Day of the Girl child, Anuradha instituted the Padmashri M.T. Vyas Sanskriti Seva Puraskar, in memory of her grandfather and well-known educationist M.T. Vyas, to encourage young girls practicing Indian music or dance towards social service. The award was presented in a grand online function, where the book ‘The Teacher and the Taught’ written by M.T. Vyas and edited by Ila Pal was released by then education minister Dr. Ramesh Pokhriyal ‘Nishank’ in the presence of various luminaries from the fields of Culture, Music, Film and the Arts. The award also carried a Kisan Vikas Patra of Rs 1,11,111 (to benefit poor farmers of India in the long term) from Jackie Shroff.

Social Service 
During the Covid-19 imposed lockdown, Anuradha distributed Rs. 10 lakh among 350 poor musicians and instrument makers and sent food ration and blankets to 270 disadvantaged, old and disabled women and children  in villages across 20 states of India - Assam, Meghalaya, Arunachal Pradesh, Gujarat, Delhi, Maharashtra, Uttarakhand, Odisha, West Bengal, Punjab, Tamil Nadu, Haryana, Karnataka, Rajasthan, Madhya Pradesh, Bihar and Uttar Pradesh.

From July 2020 onwards, Anuradha sent financial help directly to bank accounts of beneficiaries from underprivileged communities like Bhil, Manganiar, Lakha, Jogi, Garo, Kathodi, Koch-Rajbongshi, Dhadi tribes, Meghwal, Charkula, Ponung, Matka Bhawai, Terahtali, Kalbeliya dancers, Manta Drummers, Kathputli artists, Knife jugglers and Bahurupiyas.

In January 2021, she organised ‘Aatmanirbhar Kala Ke Sangh Music Festival' and gave opportunity to 25 marginalized Folk and Classical musicians from 9 states to perform online and monetize their art.

On her birthday on 8 May 2021, Anuradha and her husband donated a wheel chair, walker and over 1200 gloves and masks to patients, doctors and frontline workers in Mumbai’s BMC Covid care centre and MLC offices, in the presence of the Mayor of Mumbai, Smt Kishori Pednekar.

Awards and media recognition

Awards
Anuradha Pal is a recipient 108 prestigious awards and citations. Some of the prominent awards received by her -

Media Recognition
Featured as one of 51 women achievers of India in children's book 'The Dot that went for a walk released in 2019, along with Rani Laxmibai, Deepika Padukone, Ela Bhatt, Chhavi Rajawat amongst others.

Featured as one of the pre-eminent Torchbearers of Indian Classical Music in a book released in 2017 along with other young maestros like Mandolin U. Srinivas, Shankar Mahadevan, Kaushiki Chakraborty, amongst many others.

Featured as a Woman of Pure Wonder in a book by Vodafone Foundation in 2016 along with Justice Leila Seth, Sanjana Kapoor, Shovana Narayan, Deepa Malik, amongst various other women achievers.

Featured on Polish TV's major European channel as Asia's Youth Icon in 2008.

Featured in Documentary Gender Bender on women who have excelled & broken barriers in male dominated fields in 2006.

Featured in a film titled Woman of Substance by Doordarshan National Archives in 2006.

Featured in a documentary titled All About Her on Times Now channel in 2004.

Featured in the film Adventure Divas by the American Public Broadcasting Service (PBS) as one of the great women achievers of India and the World in 2001.

BBC World Service broadcast Anuradha Pal's Stree Shakti LIVE at WOMAD Festival in 56 countries in 1999.

Featured in the documentary titled Aaj ki Nari by Films Division of India in 1999.

BBC Radio World Service Program featured her as one of the Five Prominent Women Musicians of India in 1991.

Personal
Anuradha Pal resides in Mumbai. She conducts personalised and online percussion classes at Anuradha Pal Cultural Academy  in Juhu.

 Discography 
She has several music albums & instructional DVDs to her credit, released through her own Music Label, Sur aaur Saaz -

Taal Tiranga single
Taaleem
Bharat Vandan single
Dancing Rain singleRecharge PlusGet Recharged!!!Passion by Anuradha Pal's Stree Shakti band]Sensational & Sheer Magic - Live in Australia with Ustad Shahid ParvezKesaria - Romancing Rajasthan with Manganiar MusiciansNirvana - Spiritual BlissJugalbandi with Pt. Vishwa Mohan Bhatt and Pt. Tarun BhattacharyaRaga Marwa/ Bhairavi - Ustad Sultan Khan and Anuradha Pal Learn Tabla Well DVDs 1 & 2Jai GaneshEDM High Voltage'' single
Stree Shakti anthem for female empowerment single

References

External links
The Hindu year 2009
The Hindu year 2006
Golden Horn Records
Berklee College of Music
South Asian Women’s Network
Website
Sur aaur Saaz
Report on DNA
The right note on www.masala.com
Classical musical maestros world on Times of India
Report on Tribune India
Report on Mid-day
operatheatremadlenianum.com
Report on New York Times

Hindustani instrumentalists
Tabla players
Indian drummers
Musicians from Mumbai
Indian women musicians
Indian women classical musicians
21st-century Indian women musicians
Women musicians from Maharashtra
Living people
Year of birth missing (living people)